Avnish Dhaliwal (born 14 September 1992) is an Indian cricketer. He made his first-class debut for Chhattisgarh in the 2016–17 Ranji Trophy on 13 November 2016. He made his List A debut for Chhattisgarh in the 2016–17 Vijay Hazare Trophy on 4 March 2017.

References

External links
 

1992 births
Living people
Indian cricketers
Chhattisgarh cricketers
People from Raipur district